Macheng North railway station is a railway station in Macheng, Huanggang, Hubei, China.

History
Construction on the station began in October 2005. The station opened on 1 April 2009. The initial service level was four trains each way per day.

References 

Railway stations in Hubei
Railway stations in China opened in 2009